Mitja Zatkovič (born 7 June 1983) is a Slovenian footballer. For a very short time, he changed to Carinthia and was player for the Club FC Lurnfeld/Moellbruecke ("Unterliga West", 5th league in Austria resp. in Carinthia) from 11 February till 27 August 2013.

References

External links

1983 births
Living people
People from Postojna
Slovenian footballers
Association football forwards
NK Primorje players
NK Domžale players
Slovenian expatriate footballers
Slovenian expatriate sportspeople in Italy
Expatriate footballers in Italy
A.C. Belluno 1905 players
Slovenian football managers